Dollar Beach may refer to:
 Million Dollar Beach House, a reality streaming television series
 One Dollar Beach, East Timor
 Sand Dollar Beach, Big Sur, California, USA
 Two-Dollar Beach (Avaio Beach), American Samoa